Dodrupchen Jikmé Trinlé Özer (1745–1821) was a Nyingma tertön who was the "heart-son" of Jigme Lingpa, for whom he became the "principal doctrine-holder" of the Longchen Nyingthig terma cycle. Jigme Trinle Ozer was recognized by Jigme Lingpa as the mindstream embodiment of one of King Trisong Detsen's sons, Prince Murum Tsenpo.

Biography 
He was born in the Do valley in Golok.

Jigme Trinle Ozer blessed Patrul Rinpoche as a child and gave him his name whilst prophesying his eminence.

He founded Dodrupchen Monastery in Serta in 1810.

Some of his students were:

Ngadag Yeshey Jamtsho or Garwang Yeshey Jamtsho
Do Khyentse Yeshe Dorje

Nomenclature, etymology and orthography
The name Jikmé Trinlé Özer was given by Jigme Lingpa and means "Ray of light of Fearless Actions". Sanskrit: Abhayakarmarashmi.

Alternate names
Künzang Zhenphen, Sönam Chöden, Changchup Dorje, Drubwang Dzogchenpa

List of Drodrupchen Rinpoches 
A list of Drodrupchen Rinpoches is as follows:

Dodrupchen Jikmé Trinlé Özer (1745-1821) 
Dodrupchen Jikmé Puntsok Jungné (1824-1863) 
Dodrupchen Jikmé Tenpé Nyima (1865-1926)
Dodrupchen Rigdzin Tenpé Gyaltsen (1927-1961) & Dodrupchen Tubten Trinlé Pal Zang (1927-2022)

See also

 Tertön Sogyal, who exchanged teachings with Dodrupchen Jikmé Tenpé Nyima

Notes

References

Print
 Thondup, Tulku & Harold Talbott (Editor)(1996). Masters of Meditation and Miracles: Lives of the Great Buddhist Masters of India and Tibet. Boston, Massachusetts, USA: Shambhala, South Asia Editions.  (alk. paper);

Electronic
 Rigpa Shedra (July 20, 2008). 'Dodrupchen Jikmé Trinlé Özer'. Source:  (accessed: July 24, 2008)
 Dharma Dictionary (March 8, 2007). 'Jigme Trinley Ozer'. Source:  (accessed: July 24, 2008)

Nyingma lamas
Tulkus
Tibetan Buddhists from Tibet
18th-century Tibetan people
19th-century Tibetan people